The Annales ianuenses (Latin: "Genoese annals") or Annali Genovesi form the official history of the Republic of Genoa during the High Middle Ages. It is the earliest medieval civic chronicle and the earliest set of annals composed by a layman. The Annales form a chronological account of the history of Genoa from 1099 until 1294. The first annals were composed by Caffarus, a private citizen, on his own initiative. In 1152, he petitioned the republic to keep a copy in the public archives (comuni cartularium) and thenceforth the annals were continued at public expense. Caffarus, who probably began the work around 1100, continued it himself down to 1163. A series of officials of the chancery continued the Annales between 1169 and 1197, when work was taken over by the scribe and diplomat Ogerius. He worked down to 1216; thereafter, the annalists were anonymous, and at times a committee, until the last entry was added in 1294. The public manuscript of the Annales ianuenses is now kept in the Bibliothèque nationale de France, lat. 10136.

The content of the annals is confined to the names of the consuls, the changes to the constitution (the compagniae or sworn association), changes to the coinage and the victories of Genoa over her enemies, particularly Saracens and Pisans. In Caffarus' own words to the republic in 1152, the purpose of the chronicle was "that henceforth for all time the victories of the city of Genoa be known to future men."

Editions
Modern critical edition by the Instituto Storico Italiano

Notes

Sources

History of the Republic of Genoa
Bibliothèque nationale de France collections
12th-century books
13th-century books
Italian chronicles